1994 Kashima Antlers season

Review and events

League results summary

League results by round

Competitions

Domestic results

J.League

Suntory series

NICOS series

Emperor's Cup

J.League Cup

Player statistics

 † player(s) joined the team after the opening of this season.

Transfers

In:

Out:

Transfers during the season

In
Tomoya Ichikawa (from Kashima Antlers youth)
Edinho (from Fluminense on March)
Leonardo (from São Paulo FC on July)

Out
Zico (retired on August)

Awards
none

References

Other pages
 J. League official site
 Kashima Antlers official site

Kashima Antlers
Kashima Antlers seasons